The Piedmont Atlantic Megaregion (PAM) is a neologism created by the Regional Plan Association for an area of the Southeastern United States that includes the Atlanta, Birmingham, Charlotte, Memphis, Nashville, Research Triangle (Raleigh-Durham), and Greensboro-Winston-Salem-High Point metropolitan areas. The megaregion generally follows the Interstate 85/20 corridor.

PAM is just one emergent megalopolis (also known as a megaregion) of eleven such regions in the continental United States. Half of the nation's population growth and two-thirds of its economic growth are expected to occur within those regions over the next four decades.

Region
Studies by Virginia Tech and Georgia Tech identify the 85/20 corridor in the Southeastern United States area as an "emergent" megalopolis including the primary cities of Atlanta, Birmingham, Greenville, Spartanburg, Charlotte, Winston-Salem, Greensboro, Durham, and Raleigh with Atlanta being the largest metropolitan area and Charlotte being the largest city. Both studies refer to the area as the Piedmont megalopolis.

The Georgia Tech survey defines the region narrowly, focusing on the urban and suburban counties between Birmingham and Raleigh, and the rural counties that explicitly link those urban and suburban counties.

The Virginia Tech study proposes a broader definition, which would also include Columbus, Macon, Huntsville, Augusta, Columbia, Knoxville, Chattanooga, the Tri-Cities, Asheville and a number of smaller cities.  The western extent of this definition is deeply disconnected from the remainder of the region by the Appalachian Mountains range, and is economically not well-integrated into the greater region.  Other locales mentioned in the Virginia Tech study remain disconnected from the region's core, separated by dozens of miles of deeply rural areas.

Both reports highlight the "emergent" nature of this possible megalopolis, noting comparatively low urban densities, but also noting a pattern in growth (in the individual, component urban areas) towards each other. , this region (as defined in the Virginia Tech study) has a population of 19 million.

The Piedmont Atlantic central Metropolitan Areas are located on the southern Piedmont region which gives the Megaregion its name. The Piedmont is located between the Appalachian Mountains and the Atlantic coastal plain. The surface relief of the Piedmont is characterized by relatively low, rolling hills with heights above sea level between 200 feet (50 m) and 800 feet to (rarely) 1,000 feet (250 m to 300 m).

The region has a diverse economy ranging in many different industries. Henry W. Grady of the Atlanta Journal-Constitution coined the term New South to describe the American South, in whole or in part. The term "New South" is used in contrast to the Old South's plantation system of the antebellum period, to a new Industrial region. Since then Atlanta has grown from a small railway town into a major business, convention and transportation hub. Atlanta is now considered an "Alpha-World City" according to GaWC 2010 at Loughborough University by the Globalization and World Cities Study Group & Network. Charlotte in the Piedmont Crescent has grown to become a major U.S. financial center, and the nation's 2nd largest financial center. Birmingham boomed after the Civil War as a major industrial center in the Southern United States, the city's economy has diversified into banking, insurance, medicine, publishing, and biotechnology. The region of Raleigh, Durham, and Chapel Hill is known as the Research Triangle, named for the Research Triangle Park, which is the largest research park in the United States and one of its most prominent high-tech research and development centers. Upstate South Carolina, a region including Greenville, Spartanburg and  Anderson has been given foreign investment and has become the fastest growing region in the U.S. state of South Carolina.

Population

Primary statistical areas (PSAs) within the Piedmont Atlantic megalopolis

Transportation
Interstate I-85 and I-20 are the main corridors, and the major Interstates which are intersected are the I-59, I-95, I-40, I-73, I-74, I-77, I-26, I-75 and I-65. The gateway cities of Savannah, Charleston, and Wilmington all serve as seaports for the Piedmont Atlantic Region. Within the PAM there are six international airports, nine when including those located in the aforementioned gateway cities.

Hartsfield-Jackson Atlanta International Airport is the busiest airport in the region and in the world. Charlotte/Douglas International Airport is the second busiest airport in the region and the 17th busiest airport in the world. In addition to Charlotte and Atlanta, other airports in the region with direct, non-stop airline service outside North America include: Raleigh-Durham International Airport, Charleston International Airport, and Nashville International Airport. Other major airports in the region include: Piedmont Triad International Airport, Asheville Regional Airport, Wilmington International Airport, Birmingham-Shuttlesworth International Airport, Huntsville International Airport, Greenville-Spartanburg International Airport, Myrtle Beach International Airport, Columbia Metropolitan Airport, Hilton Head Airport, McGhee Tyson Airport, and Memphis International Airport, which is the world's busiest airport by most cargo traffic by weight annually.

Megaregion as a unit
The Piedmont Atlantic is the fastest growing mega-region in the United States. The mega-region is facing challenges with its growing population, increased traffic congestion, and inadequate infrastructure. Mayors, businesses, and academic professionals have organized the Piedmont Alliance for Quality Growth to help address these problems with sustainable solutions. With the goal of focusing on the growth of the Megaregion, they have called for less competition between cities and metropolitan areas in the same region, and a stronger and more cohesive ability to work together to compete on the global scale. The major issues that the PAM has to solve include conflicts over shared natural resources such as water and problems transportation infrastructure such as road upkeep and the railways linking cities. Many of the issues cities or metropolitan areas face cannot be solved by action on a local scale. A Megaregion as a unit working together is an advantage in economics and quality of life within the region.

Culture
The culture of the PAM is a subset of the culture of the greater Southern United States. It is mainly a combination of the cultures of Georgia and North Carolina, as these two states have the greatest populations by far of the five states that make up the region, and contain most of the region's major cities.

Sports

Professional sports teams in the region include:

 Atlanta Braves (Major League Baseball)
 Atlanta Dream (Women's National Basketball Association)
 Atlanta Falcons (National Football League)
 Atlanta Hawks (National Basketball Association)
 Atlanta United FC (Major League Soccer)
 Birmingham Barons (Minor League Baseball)
 Charlotte FC      (Major League Soccer)
 Carolina Hurricanes (National Hockey League)
 Carolina Panthers (National Football League)
 Charlotte Hornets (National Basketball Association)
 Charlotte Knights (Minor League Baseball)
 Durham Bulls (Minor League Baseball)
 Memphis Grizzlies (National Basketball Association)
 Nashville Predators (National Hockey League)
 North Carolina Courage (National Women's Soccer League)
 Rocket City Trash Pandas (Minor League Baseball)
 Tennessee Titans (National Football League)

College athletics teams in the so-called Power Five conferences include:

 Alabama Crimson Tide (Southeastern Conference)
 Auburn Tigers (Southeastern Conference)
 Clemson Tigers (Atlantic Coast Conference)
 Duke Blue Devils (Atlantic Coast Conference)
 Georgia Bulldogs (Southeastern Conference)
 Georgia Tech Yellow Jackets (Atlantic Coast Conference)
 NC State Wolfpack (Atlantic Coast Conference)
 North Carolina Tar Heels (Atlantic Coast Conference)
 South Carolina Gamecocks (Southeastern Conference)
 Tennessee Volunteers (Southeastern Conference)
 Vanderbilt Commodores (Southeastern Conference)
 Wake Forest Demon Deacons (Atlantic Coast Conference)

Notable sports competitions include:

 1996 Summer Olympics
 Barbasol Championship
 Masters Tournament
 St. Jude Classic
 The Tradition
 Wells Fargo Championship
 Wyndham Championship
 U.S. National Indoor Tennis Championships
 2022 World Games Birmingham

Notable motorsport racetracks include:

 Atlanta Dragway
 Atlanta Motor Speedway
 Barber Motorsports Park
 Bristol Motor Speedway
 Charlotte Motor Speedway
 Darlington Raceway
 Nashville Superspeedway
 North Wilkesboro Speedway
 Road Atlanta
 Talladega Superspeedway

Attractions
Charlotte hosts the NASCAR Hall of Fame, Charlotte Motor Speedway, Daniel Stowe Botanical Garden, Discovery Place, Bechtler Museum of Modern Art, Uptown Mint Museum, Carowinds Amusement Park, Bank of America Headquarters, U.S. National Whitewater Center, and the Billy Graham Library. The nearby North Carolina Zoological Park is located in Asheboro in Randolph County, North Carolina in the Uwharrie Mountains and Uwharrie National Forest. At over 500 acres (200 ha), it is the largest walk-through zoo in the world. Crowders Mountain State Park in Gastonia provides hiking and rock climbing opportunities.

Atlanta hosts 37 million tourists every year. Attractions include the Atlanta Motor Speedway, Centennial Olympic Park, CNN Center, Georgia Aquarium, Martin Luther King Jr. National Historic Park, Road Atlanta, Six Flags Over Georgia, Stone Mountain Park, and World of Coca-Cola.

Chattanooga hosts the Tennessee Aquarium, and the Lookout Mountain Incline Railway.

Birmingham, at the southern end of the Piedmont Atlantic megaregion, is home to several museums; the largest is the Birmingham Museum of Art, which is also the largest municipal art museum in the Southeast. The area's history museums include Birmingham Civil Rights Institute, which houses a detailed and emotionally charged narrative exhibit putting Birmingham's history into the context of the Civil Rights Movement located at the Birmingham Civil Rights National Monument, Birmingham Civil Rights District. The Sloss Furnaces National Historic Landmark and the Vulcan statue and museum that overlooks the city and provides views from atop Red Mountain details the industrial history of the area. Other Birmingham area attractions include Alabama Adventure Amusement Park, McWane Science Center, Red Mountain Park, Birmingham Botanical Gardens (United States), and the Alabama Sports Hall of Fame. The Birmingham area also includes two prominent race tracks, Talladega Superspeedway and Barber Motorsports Park and museum, which features over 1400 motorcycles and race cars and is the largest collection of motorcycles in the world. Greenville, South Carolina, offers Falls Park on the Reedy, a 32-acre (130,000 m2) park adjacent to downtown in the historic West End district.

The Appalachian mountains provide many outdoor opportunities, including hiking, road and mountain biking, driving and motorcycling, rafting, and kayaking. Major attractions in the region are the area around Asheville, Great Smoky Mountains National Park (the US's most visited National Park), the Blue Ridge Parkway (the US's other most visited park), Mt Mitchell (the highest mountain in the eastern US), the Appalachian Trail, the Chatooga Wild and Scenic River, the Jocassee Gorges, Grandfather Mountain, the Ocoee River, the Tail of the Dragon, and Pisgah National Forest.

The region also has multiple major national and state parks. These include:

 The Blue Ridge Parkway (NC & VA)
 Great Smoky Mountains National Park (NC & TN)
 Mt Michell State Park (NC)
 Chimney Rock State Park (NC)
 Grandfather Mountain State Park (NC)
 Gorges State Park (NC)
 Hanging Rock State Park (NC)
 Crowders Mountain State Park (NC)
 King's Mountain National Military Park (SC)
 Table Rock State Park (SC)
 Ceaser's Head and Jones Gap State Parks (SC)
 Mountain Bridge Wilderness Area (SC)
 Chattahoochee–Oconee National Forest (GA)
 Tallulah Gorge State Park (GA)
 Lookout Mountain (TN & GA)
 Lake Guntersville State Park (AL)
 Joe Wheeler State Park (AL)

Education
The area is home to a number of colleges and universities, including:

 Agnes Scott College
 Alabama A & M University
 Alabama State University
 Albany State University
 Anderson University
 Appalachian State University
 Auburn University
 Augusta University
 Austin Peay State University
 Belmont University
 Belmont Abbey College
 Bevill State Community College
 Birmingham Southern College
 Bob Jones University
 Brevard College
 Carson-Newman College
 Catawba College
 Central Piedmont Community College
 Charlotte School of Law
 Christian Brothers University
 Clark Atlanta University
 Clayton State University
 Clemson University
 Columbus State University
 Converse College
 Cumberland University
 Davidson College
 Duke University
 East Tennessee State University
 Elon University
 Emory University
 Fisk University
 Fort Valley State University
 Furman University
 Gardner–Webb University
 Georgia Gwinnett College
 Georgia State University
 Georgia Tech
 Gordon State College
 Greensboro College
 Greenville Technical College
 Guilford College
 High Point University
 Jacksonville State University
 Johnson C. Smith University
 Johnson & Wales University
 Kennesaw State University
 LaGrange College
 Lenoir-Rhyne University
 Limestone College
 Lipscomb University
 Livingstone College
 Louisburg College
 Meharry Medical College
 Meredith College
 Middle Tennessee State University
 Morehouse College
 North Carolina A&T State University
 North Carolina Central University
 North Carolina State University
 North Greenville University
 Oakwood University
 Oglethorpe University
 Paine College
 Peace College
 Pfeiffer University
 Presbyterian College
 Piedmont University
 Queens University of Charlotte
 Rhodes College
 Saint Augustine's College
 Salem College
 Samford University
 Savannah College of Art and Design
 Shaw University
 Southcentral Kentucky Community and Technical College
 Southern Polytechnic State University
 Southern Wesleyan University
 Spartanburg Community College
 Spelman College
 Tennessee State University
 Tennessee Technological University
 Trevecca Nazarene University
 Tuskegee University
 University of Alabama
 University of Alabama at Birmingham
 University of Alabama in Huntsville
 University of Georgia
 University of Memphis
 University of Montevallo
 University of North Carolina at Asheville
 University of North Carolina at Chapel Hill
 University of North Carolina at Charlotte
 University of North Carolina at Greensboro
 University of North Carolina at Wilmington
 University of North Carolina School of the Arts
University of North Georgia
 University of South Carolina Aiken
 University of South Carolina Columbia
 University of South Carolina Upstate
 University of Tennessee, Knoxville
University of West Georgia
 Vanderbilt University
 Wake Forest University
 Western Kentucky University
 Wilkes Community College
 Winston-Salem State University
 Wingate University
 Winthrop University
 Wofford College

See also

 I-85 Corridor
 Charlanta
 Conurbation
 Megalopolis (city type)
 Megaregions of the United States
 Piedmont Crescent

References

 Georgia Tech: Center for Quality Growth & Regional Development
 Megaregion plans are underway
 http://www.america2050.org/megaregions.html
 Globalization and Megaregions
 http://www.lboro.ac.uk/gawc/world2008t.html
 http://www.rtp.org/main

Further reading
 

Regions of the Southern United States
Megapolitan areas of the United States